Theofilos Karasavvidis (born 27 April 1971) is a Greek former professional footballer who played as a midfielder.

Club career
Theofilos Karasavvidis started his career in 1989 until 1995 in Apollon Smyrnis. In 1995 he moved to Olympiacos, where he won the Greek Championship in the season 1996–97. In 1997 he moved to Panionios where he won the Greek Cup in the season 1997–98 against Panathinaikos at Karaiskakis Stadium. In 1999 he moved to Italy, in Sassari, where he played for  Polisportiva Sassari Torres, then for Como, for Catania and Lanciano. In 2002 he moved to Frosinone, Pro Patria, Monza and Caratese.

International career
Karasavvidis in 1993 he played for Greece U21 in a friendly match against Germany U21 ended 3-3. He also played for Greece from 1992 until 1995, where on 29 January 1992, he made his debut in the senior team against Albania.

After retirement
After retiring from competitive activity, he worked as a physiotherapist in a Wellness Center in Como. In February 2018 he returned to Sassari and was warmly welcomed by the Sassari Torres fans at the Stadio Vanni Sanna. He also became the agent of some players such as Marios Oikonomou, Dimitris Diamantakos, Charalampos Lykogiannis. He is the agent of Dušan Vlahović of Fiorentina and Alfredo Morelos of Rangers.

Career statistics

Club

International

Honours

Club 
Olympiacos'''
Greek Championship: 1996–97

Panionios
 Greek Cup: 1997–98

Sassari Torres
Serie D: 1999–00

Individual
Top Scorer of Serie C1: 1
Sassari Torres: 1999–00 (19 gol)

References

External links
 
 
 

1971 births
Living people
Greek footballers
Apollon Smyrnis F.C. players
Olympiacos F.C. players
Panionios F.C. players
S.E.F. Torres 1903 players
Como 1907 players
Catania S.S.D. players
S.S. Virtus Lanciano 1924 players
Frosinone Calcio players
Aurora Pro Patria 1919 players
A.C. Monza players
Super League Greece players
Greece under-21 international footballers
Greece international footballers
Association football midfielders
Greek expatriate footballers
Expatriate footballers in Italy
Greek expatriate sportspeople in Italy
Footballers from Giannitsa